Christopher "Maverick" Blair is a fictional character in the science fiction franchise Wing Commander, first appearing in the video game Wing Commander in 1990, although he was only given a canonical name years later. He is a protagonist player character throughout much of the Wing Commander game series and also appears in several Wing Commander novels, notably the novelizations of Wing Commander III: Heart of the Tiger and Wing Commander IV: The Price of Freedom, and in the film Wing Commander.

In Wing Commander III, Wing Commander IV, Wing Commander: Prophecy, and the animated television series Wing Commander Academy, Blair was played and voiced by veteran actor and Star Wars legend Mark Hamill. Blair was one of the best received characters in PC gaming during the 1990s.

Appearances
Blair has no official name for the first two installments of the series; the player is allowed to personalize the character's name and call sign. In Ultimate Strategy Guide for Wing Commander I & II, the character is named Carl T. LaFong, nicknamed "Prankster" (Carl T. LaFong become a separate character in Star*Soldier the manual for Wing Commander Arena). In Super Wing Commander (a remake of the first game made for Macintosh and 3DO), the character is named Jason Armstrong (Jason Armstrong becomes a separate character in Star*Soldier the manual for Wing Commander Arena), and in the Sega Mega-CD version of Wing Commander, he does not have a name, only a call sign, "Hotshot". Origin Systems' in-house "bible" referred to him as "Bluehair", and when the full motion video cut scenes in Wing Commander III required the character be given a name, this tag was shortened to "Blair". "Christopher" is the first name of series creator Chris Roberts.

In Wing Commander III and IV, the player is still allowed to assign Blair a call sign, but William R. Forstchen's novelizations describe him as using the call sign "Maverick". This is confirmed in Wing Commander: Prophecy. The series "bible" indicates that other candidates for Blair's call sign included "Falcon" and "Phoenix", the latter of which saw print in the novel End Run. The "Maverick" call sign is widely used in later publications. Throughout the series Blair was portrayed as competent and cool-headed, though not unemotional, and in the animated TV series his "rebellious" cockpit moniker is assigned him as an ironic reference to his "by-the-book" personality. Finally, during the course of Wing Commander III, Blair finds out that he is the game's titular "Heart of the Tiger", and in the Wing Commander IV novelization uses this as a public call sign. In the second novelization in an abortive trilogy based on the film, Blair adopts the call sign "Pilgrim" in an acknowledgment of his ethnic roots.

In video games
In the original Wing Commander, Blair is a calm, handsome fellow who rarely speaks. Despite his lack of volubility, he rises steadily into the ranks of the TCS Tiger's Claw, eventually leading his flight wing to numerous successes in the Vega Sector campaign, Operation Thor's Hammer and the Firekkan campaign, eventually reaching the rank of lieutenant colonel and being awarded numerous medals, including the Terran Confederation Medal of Honor. When the Claw moves into the K'tithrak Mang sector to deal with a Kilrathi command post, however, his number comes up: with the sole exception of a few pilots who had been transferred to other ships, and Blair himself who is out on patrol, the Claw is lost with all hands; no one can confirm how. Blair's flight data recorder picks up odd signals that appear to be Kilrathi fighters with cloaking devices, but it is stolen when he lands on the TCS Austin. Admiral Geoffrey Tolwyn believes that Blair is lying to cover his own treachery, finds him guilty of negligence (due to lack of evidence), demotes him to captain and exiles him to the backwater Caernavon Station. Blair is widely branded the "Coward of K'tithrak Mang" and reviled throughout the Terran Confederation.

Ten years later, in Wing Commander II: Vengeance of the Kilrathi, Blair is still on Caernavon, but when the TCS Concordia, Tolwyn's new flagship, jumps in-system and is ambushed, Blair singlehandedly rescues it. Cognizant of the need to keep the best pilots on the front lines, Tolwyn reluctantly shifts Blair to active service aboard the Concordia, where he serves alongside a number of old friends from the Claw: Jeannette "Angel" Devereaux, Mariko "Spirit" Tanaka, Etienne "Doomsday" Montclair, defected Kilrathi pilot Ralgha "Hobbes" nar Hhallas and Zack "Jazz" Colson. New to the roster is Dirk "Stingray" Wright, enthusiastic and brash. James "Paladin" Taggart drops in on occasion, but Todd "Maniac" Marshall is far away doing testing on Morningstar-class heavy fighters. To dampen the mood, however, a saboteur is on the Concordia, committing terrorist acts and assassinating Confed personnel. In his time aboard the Concordia, Blair is able to finally record incontrovertible evidence of the Kilrathi Strakha stealth fighters, uncover and defeat the traitor ("Jazz" Colson), destroy the K'Tithrak Mang HQ and avenge the Tiger's Claw, and start a romantic liaison with Angel. He is also promoted to the rank of colonel by a grudgingly respectful Tolwyn. More ominously, he gains the personal attention of Kilrathi Crown Prince Thrakhath nar Kiranka; he is eventually given the Kilrathi warrior name "Heart of the Tiger".

Blair subsequently becomes involved in a number of Secret Ops projects, including the TCS Gettysburg mutiny, the defection of four Kilrathi planets to the Confederation, the testing of the new Morningstar heavy fighter and deployment of the Crossbow prototype bomber, and the destruction of the traitorous Society of Mandarins (culminating in Maverick finally defeating and killing Jazz in single combat). He fights at the Battle of Earth and is grounded with injuries for six months, during which time the Kilrathi push the Confederation to the wall. He resumes active duty just in time for Wing Commander III: Heart of the Tiger to start.

With the Concordia lost in the Vespus system and his lover, Angel gone MIA, Blair (now portrayed by Mark Hamill) is assigned to the TCS Victory, a carrier twice as old as he is (late 30s) and being kept to the rear lines of the war. Despite the relatively unglamorous nature of his assignment, Blair, along with his wing of pilots including top aces Hobbes and Maniac, is able to provide at least some defense for the TCS Behemoth before its destruction at the hands of a traitor. It is from this point that Blair discovers what truly happened to Angel through a holographic recording. An unstable and vengeful Blair then leads a wing that is responsible for delivering the Temblor Bomb on the Kilrathi home planet, resulting in the death of the Emperor, as well as Prince Thrakhath (engaged and defeated by Blair in the planet's atmosphere) and is able to avenge Angel. The destruction of Kilrah leads to the surrender of the Kilrathi and the signing of a permanent peace treaty, ending the 40-year Terran-Kilrathi War. Blair is now entitled to add a new label to his roster: "Savior of the Confederation".

After the war, Blair attempts to return to his roots on Nephele II and become a farmer. Tolwyn reactivates him at the start of Wing Commander IV: The Price of Freedom however, to investigate allegations that the Union of Border Worlds has been causing trouble for Confed shipping (claims that Confed is doing the same thing to Border Worlds shipping are ignored). A third faction is eventually implicated, and Blair succeeds in uncovering it, though he is forced to defect to the Union of Border Worlds to do so, since the faction appears to be supported by elements within Confed. This so-called "Black Lance Affair" results in the disgrace and suicide of Space Marshal Tolwyn.

Blair remains in the military for the rest of his life, though he accepts a transfer from Space Forces to Navy. He is the architect and main proponent of the 'mega-carrier' plan, and is aboard the TCS Midway, the first of the new class, on its maiden voyage, detailed in Wing Commander: Prophecy. When the ship unexpectedly encounters invaders from another part of the galaxy (codenamed "Nephilim"), the Midway single-handedly beats them back, mostly led by player character Lieutenant Lance Casey. Commodore Blair is lost in the action against the Nephilim, missing and presumed dead on a critical mission to assist Casey in destroying the aliens' galaxy-invading wormhole.

In other media
Blair appears in the Wing Commander Academy animated series, again voiced by Mark Hamill.

In the 1999 live-action film Wing Commander, Blair was portrayed by actor Freddie Prinze, Jr. This version of Blair is a "Pilgrim" who possesses a superhuman space navigation ability. He is also on much friendlier terms with Admiral Tolwyn.

Blair appears in the Wing Commander novels Wing Commander: Heart of the Tiger (WCIII game novelization), Wing Commander: The Price of Freedom (WCIV game novelization), Wing Commander (movie novelization), Wing Commander: Pilgrim Stars (sequel to the movie novel; Blair chooses the callsign "Pilgrim" by novel's end), Wing Commander: Pilgrim Truth (third novel based upon the movie), and Wing Commander: End Run (in this novel his callsign is "Phoenix").

Reception
The character was very well received and was during the series' heydey he has been widely regarded as one of the best in gaming at the time. Computer Gaming World ranked Blair as number one on their 1996 list of the most memorable game heroes, calling him "an unforgettable character, from the old 'blue hair' days to the full-motion video cinematics featuring Mark Hamill". GameSpot included him on their 1999 list of ten best heroes in gaming, describing his as a mundane, superficially unheroic character who shows his heroic endurance through a lifetime of struggles. In 2010, Kotaku listed him among the Electronic Arts "stars who would be right at home in two dimensions kicking someone's ass".

References

External links
Christopher 'Maverick' Blair  at IMDb

Fictional aviators
Fictional military captains
Fictional colonels
Fictional lieutenants
Fictional majors
Male characters in video games
Fictional military personnel in video games
Science fiction film characters
Wing Commander (franchise)
Video game characters introduced in 1990